Thiotricha paraconta is a moth of the family Gelechiidae. It was described by Edward Meyrick in 1904. It is found in Australia, where it has been recorded from New South Wales.

The forewings are shining white, with a faint ochreous tinge and with the costal edge dark fuscous towards the base. There is a dark fuscous dorsal streak from one-fourth to before the tornus, then continued very obliquely upwards, reaching halfway across the wing. There are two rather suffused oblique dark fuscous streaks from the costa towards the apex and a black apical dot. The hindwings are grey.

References

Moths described in 1904
Taxa named by Edward Meyrick
Thiotricha